Garthiope is a genus of crabs in the family Xanthidae, containing the following species:

 Garthiope anchialina Guinot & Iliffe, 1991
 Garthiope barbadensis (Rathbun, 1921)
 Garthiope fraseri (Garth, 1946)
 Garthiope spinipes (A. Milne Edwards, 1880)

References

Xanthoidea